Kestur  is a village in the southern state of Karnataka, India. It is located in the Krishnarajanagara taluk of Mysore district.

Demographics
 India census, Kestur had a population of 5449 with 2729 males and 2720 females.

See also
 Mysore
 Districts of Karnataka

References

External links

Villages in Mysore district